The Mall at Short Hills, also known as the Short Hills Mall, is a shopping mall located in the Short Hills section of Millburn, New Jersey, United States.

The mall includes 150 specialty stores and restaurants including Balenciaga, Bruno Cucinelli, Burberry, Bvlgari, Cartier, Chanel, Dior, Christian Louboutin, Dolce and Gabbana, Fendi, Gucci, Hermès,  Louis Vuitton, Jimmy Choo, Max Mara, Oliver Peoples, Prada, Saint Laurent, Salvatore Ferragamo, and Van Cleef & Arpels,  it is anchored by Bloomingdale's, Macy's, Neiman Marcus, and Nordstrom. Over 40 boutiques have their only New Jersey location at the mall.

History

Throughout the first half of the century, the suburban community grew quickly, and local residents desired quality shopping within their local setting.  Their vision began to take shape in 1949 when the Prudential Insurance Company of America acquired a large tract of land where The Mall at Short Hills and part of the Canoe Brook Country Club now sit.  Seven years later, B. Altman & Company opened a 130,000-square-foot store on the land and eventually added an additional 50,000 square feet to meet market demands.  Local residents continued their demand for expanded retailing and in the early '60s, a small center opened.  The open-air center included Bonwit Teller along with retailers such as FAO Schwarz, Pottery Barn and Brentano's.  The momentum continued as America's largest Bloomingdale's premiered on the site in 1967.  The 243,000-square-foot store included an entire floor devoted to furniture and decorative accessories.  In addition, smaller "boutiques" were created in the store such as, Young World, Delicacies Shop, Au Gourmet, a men's store, and a Stouffer's restaurant.

In 1974, Prudential Insurance Company of America began working with The Taubman Company, The Mall at Short Hills' current owner.  By 1980, the two had completed a two-year, $100 million project to enclose the mall, which at that time included 1,160,000 of gross leasable space and three anchor stores.  New retailers included Godiva Chocolatier, Black Star and Frost, The Limited and Gap.  The following year, 1981, Abraham & Straus joined the center.

The first phase of a major expansion began in 1993, and was completed in November 1994 adding a 100,000-square-foot Saks Fifth Avenue. Bloomingdale's was renovated, and Abraham & Straus became Macy's.  The next expansion phase was completed in August 1995 adding two anchors—a 129,000 square-foot Neiman Marcus and a 172,000 square-foot Nordstrom—and many new specialty stores including Tiffany & Co., Crate & Barrel, DKNY and others.

In 2016, Saks Fifth Avenue stopped their lease in favor of a larger store at American Dream Meadowlands. It was then announced the space would be reconstructed to feature additional stores such as  the U.S. debut of Indigo Books, a relocated Crate & Barrel, and Industrious, a pet-friendly, co-working office spacestore.

References

External links

 Shop Short Hills - Official website of The Mall at Short Hills
 Mall at Short Hills leasing information

Millburn, New Jersey
Shopping malls in New Jersey
Mall at Short Hill, The
Shopping malls established in 1980
Taubman Centers
Tourist attractions in Essex County, New Jersey
Shopping malls in the New York metropolitan area